is a railway station on the Chūō Main Line in the city of Nakatsugawa, Gifu Prefecture, Japan, operated by Central Japan Railway Company (JR Central).

Lines

Layout
The station has one ground-level island platform connected by a footbridge. The station has a Midori no Madoguchi staffed ticket office.

Platforms

Adjacent stations

History
Mino-Sakamoto Station opened on 15 November 1917. On 1 April 1987, it became part of JR Central.

Passenger statistics
In fiscal 2014, the station was used by an average of 1,350 passengers daily (boarding passengers only).

Surrounding area
Sakamoto Elementary School
Sakamoto Junior High School

See also

 List of Railway Stations in Japan

References

Railway stations in Japan opened in 1917
Railway stations in Gifu Prefecture
Stations of Central Japan Railway Company
Chūō Main Line
Nakatsugawa, Gifu